was a Japanese samurai of the Sengoku period. He was the son of daimyō Sanada Masayuki and the older brother of Sanada Yukimura.

Early life

He was the first son of Sanada Masayuki and his wife, Kansho-in. His younger brother was Sanada Yukimura. He was married to Komatsuhime (Inahime), Honda Tadakatsu's daughter and adopted daughter of Tokugawa Ieyasu.

Two other wives of Nobuyuki were his first wife and cousin Seiin-in, who lost her status to Komatsuhime and Ukyo (a daughter of Tamagawa Hidemasa).

At an early age, Nobuyuki's father served under the daimyō Takeda Shingen and sent Nobuyuki as a hostage to prove the Sanada clan's loyalty to the Takeda clan. After the Takeda clan was destroyed by Oda and Tokugawa army, Nobuyuki fled to Ueda Castle, the stronghold of the Sanada Clan and where his family were.

In 1585, Tokugawa Ieyasu attacked Ueda Castle; Nobuyuki fought in Battle of Kami river alongside his father and was victorious. Later, as Masayuki served under Toyotomi Hideyoshi, Nobuyuki was sent to Tokugawa to be a retainer in order to preserve the clan if anything wrong happened to the Toyotomi clan.

Battle of Sekigahara

During the Battle of Sekigahara, he fought on the side of Tokugawa Ieyasu, against whom Masayuki and his brother, Yukimura were fighting. After the Western Army was defeated by Ieyasu, Nobuyuki used this position to save his father's and brother's lives.

After the battle Masayuki's territory was seized, Masayuki and Yukimura were exiled to Kudoyama in Mt. Koya in the Kii Province. Ueda was given to Nobuyuki.

Siege of Osaka

In 1614, the relationship between the Tokugawa and Toyotomi started heating up again. Ieyasu ordered 10,000 army to surround Osaka Castle.

Yukimura escaped from Kudoyama and serve Toyotomi to take the fight against the Tokugawa.  Accepting the truth, Nobuyuki couldn't spare Yukimura again and his brother was killed in battle.

After the Siege of Osaka, Tokugawa generally had a high regard of Nobuyuki. In 1622, he became the first lord of the Matsushiro clan and lived to 92 years of age.

Honours
 Junior Fifth Rank

See also
Sanada Taiheiki a Japanese drama 
Sanada Maru a Japanese drama
Samurai Warriors: Spirit of Sanada a hack and slash video game that focuses on the Sanada clan

External links
Matsushiro, a Castle Town of the Sanada Family
Photo of the Matsushiro castle
http://sanadasandai.gozaru.jp/sandai/nobuyuki/nobuyuki-2.htm (Information about Nobuyuki's children)

|-

|-

People of Edo-period Japan
1566 births
1658 deaths
Daimyo
Sanada clan